Zhang Jian (1 July 1853– 24 August 1926), courtesy name Jizhi (季直), sobriquet Se'an (啬庵), was a Chinese entrepreneur, politician and educator. He is known as a "new gentry" and official-entrepreneur.

Biography
Zhang was born in Haimen county, Jiangsu province in 1853. He became a member of staff under the general Wu Changqing. He returned to the hometown after Wu's death. He was studying agriculture while preparing for the further examination, and achieved the highest score in the 1894 Palace Examination and exalted status as zhuangyuan eventually. He subsequently served at the Hanlin Academy. 

Zhang was obliged to return to his hometown for mourning his father, in the same year. After the First Sino-Japanese War, he began to invest in and create modern enterprises. He founded Dah Sun Cotton Mill, which financed by both the imperial court and local merchants, in Nantong later. Besides, he branched out into land reclamation, river conservancy, modern education, especially in the northern Jiangsu. It is generally accepted that Zhang is a successful entrepreneur, however, some financial improprieties led Dah Sun to an insolvent liquidation in the 1920s. 

Zhang proclaimed that "the victory of Japan and the defeat of Russia are the victory of constitutionalism and the defeat of monarchism". In 1909, he was elected the chairman of Jiangsu provincial assembly. He refused the membership of the Friends of the Constitution, and acted as a buffer against the active constitutionalists. But in the end of 1911, his thought swung in the republican's favour. Then he drafted the original Edict of Abdication for Puyi. He was appointed as the Minister of Enterprise of the temporary government of the Provisional Government in Nanjing, but did not take the office actually. In 1913, Zhang became the Minister of Industry and Commerce and Minister of Agriculture and Forestry in Beiyang Government.

Achievements

Zhang was among the pioneers of the Chinese modernization. Aside from companies and factories, he also founded the first normal school in modern China, Tongzhou Normal College in 1902 and established Nantong Museum, the first museum in Mainland China in 1905.  He remoulded the infrastructure of Nantong and made it became a template for earlier urban development in China.

The institutes founded or funded by Zhang Jian:

 Nantong University (1902)
 Fudan University (1905)
 Nantong Middle School of Jiangsu Province (1909)
 Shanghai Ocean University (1912)
 Hohai University (1915)

Further reading

 Claypool, Lisa. Zhang Jian and China's First Museum. Journal of Asian Studies 64, 3 (2005): 567–604.
 Chu, Samuel C. . Reformer in Modern China: Chang Chien, 1853–1926. New York: Columbia University Press, 1965.

Notes

References

 
 

1853 births
1926 deaths
Unity Party (China) politicians
Republican Party (China) politicians
Progressive Party (China) politicians
19th-century Chinese businesspeople